Amado Guevara (born 2 May 1976) is a Honduran former professional footballer and manager. He was the coach of Puerto Rico from 2018 to 2019.

A former midfielder, he is the second all-time cap leader for the Honduras national team seconded by Maynor Figueroa . He was selected as the Best Player of the 2001 Copa América, held in Colombia.

Career

Club
Guevara, nicknamed El Lobo, began his career in Honduras with Club Deportivo Olimpia and F.C. Motagua, and subsequently played all over the world: in Spain with Real Valladolid, in Mexico with Toros Neza and CD Zacatepec, and in Costa Rica with Deportivo Saprissa.

He was signed by the MetroStars of Major League Soccer on 11 April 2003, and immediately stepped in and produced. Although he finished the season with only three goals and ten assists (he added another goal in the playoffs), he became the focal point of the team; they were successful when the offense flowed through him. Guevara added four key goals and two assists in the U.S. Open Cup, leading the MetroStars to the first final of any sort in the team's history.

Guevara tallied ten goals (six on penalties) and ten assists in his second season. Guevara not only tied for the league lead in scoring, he was also named MLS's MVP. In 2005, he produced another solid season for the Metros, with 11 goals and 11 assists, and added a goal in the playoffs.

In early 2006, a conflict arose between Guevara and the MetroStars. The club allowed him to train with F.C. Motagua, but Guevara played for the Honduran club in a number of friendly matches, which might or might not have been permitted. Guevara lashed out in the Honduran press at the Metros' GM Alexi Lalas, but the two patched things up and Guevara remained in New York for the 2006 season. He received his green card in March 2006, thus no longer counting as a foreign player in MLS. During the last game of the re-branded New York Red Bulls season, Guevara scored a hat trick helping them win 3–2 and reach the playoffs.

Following the 2006 season, Guevara was traded to Chivas USA in exchange for a designated player slot. After playing just four games for the club, Chivas USA coach Preki told MLSnet.com that "I have a vision of where the club is going and [Guevara's] not part of it."  This comment came following consistently poor performance on the field and an incident in which Guevara was sent off for pushing an assistant referee. Attempts to deal the midfielder to Toronto FC, Colorado Rapids, FC Dallas, and Columbus Crew were all shot down by Guevara. Guevara then accepted a loan move to his former club F.C. Motagua for the remainder of the 2007 season. He quickly recovered the form that made him a star in the US top flight, leading the Honduran club to the Central American Club Championship Copa Interclubes UNCAF 2007 defeating regional and Costa Rican giant Saprissa 2–1 on aggregate on 5 December 2007.

On 9 April 2008, Guevara was traded to Toronto FC for a 2009 and 2010 draft pick. He made his debut for Toronto FC in his new team's first win of the 2008 season, assisting Danny Dichio for the first goal of the game against the Los Angeles Galaxy. On 3 August 2008, Guevara was shown a straight red card by referee Baldomero Toledo after allegedly elbowing FC Dallas player Pablo Ricchetti in the face. The elbow drew blood, and Guevara was immediately thrown from the game. He received a 2-game suspension. While at TFC Guevara quickly became a fan favourite and was known for his darting runs, and spectacular free kicks. Guevara performed consistently well while in Toronto scoring a total of 9 goals over the course of the season, including 2 in the Canadian Championship. Guevara left Toronto to return to Honduran side F.C. Motagua in December 2009.

In the 2010-11 CONCACAF Champions League, Motagua was drawn against his former team, Toronto FC, in the preliminary round. Despite Guevara scoring two goals in the home leg, Motagua was eliminated 3–2 on aggregate.

In January 2013, el Lobo scored his 64th goal for Motagua, only 4 short of Óscar Hernández' 68 and 13 short of the club's all-time record goalscorer Ángel Obando.

In 2014, Guevara signed with Honduran side Marathón. He retired in 2015.

International
He made his debut for Honduras in an May 1994 Miami Cup match against Peru and has earned a total of 138 caps, scoring 27 goals. He has represented his country in 49 FIFA World Cup qualification matches and played at 5 UNCAF Nations Cups as well as at the 1998, 2000 and 2007 CONCACAF Gold Cups.

His final international was a June 2010 FIFA World Cup match against eventual winners Spain.

He was named the tournament MVP after leading Honduras to a surprise third-place finish in the 2001 Copa América. Honduras (a last minute call-up when Argentina dropped out a day before kickoff on 11 July 2001) arrived after the tournament started, just few hours before its first game with barely enough players. In the quarterfinal round, Honduras defeated Brazil (the favorite to win the tournament) by a score of 2–0. The defeat sent Brazil home and Honduras advanced to the semifinals.

Guevara helped lead Honduras through the qualification to the 2010 FIFA World Cup and captained the team at only their second appearance at a World Cup tournament.

Career statistics

Club
Source:

International goals
Scores and results list Honduras' goal tally first.

Managerial statistics

Honours

F.C. Motagua
 Copa Interclubes UNCAF: 2007
 Honduran Liga Nacional (5): 1997–98 A, 1997–98 C, 1999–00 A, 1999–00 C, 2010–11 C
 Honduran Super Cup: 1997–98

New York Red Bulls
 Atlantic Cup: 2003
 La Manga Cup: 2004

Toronto FC
 Canadian Championship: 2009

Honduras
 Copa Centroamericana: 1995

Individual
 Major League Soccer MVP: 2004
 MLS Scoring Champion: 2004
 MLS Best XI: 2004
 MLS All-Star Game MVP: 2004
 Copa América MVP: 2001

See also
 List of men's footballers with 100 or more international caps

References

External links

Midfield Dynamo's 10 Heroes of the Copa América Amado Guevara listed in the top 10
 Amado Guevara – Century of International Appearances – RSSSF
 Profile – FIFA

1976 births
Living people
Sportspeople from Tegucigalpa
Association football midfielders
Honduran footballers
Honduras international footballers
1998 CONCACAF Gold Cup players
2000 CONCACAF Gold Cup players
2001 UNCAF Nations Cup players
2001 Copa América players
2003 UNCAF Nations Cup players
2007 CONCACAF Gold Cup players
2009 UNCAF Nations Cup players
2010 FIFA World Cup players
C.D. Olimpia players
F.C. Motagua players
Real Valladolid players
Club Atlético Zacatepec players
Deportivo Saprissa players
New York Red Bulls players
Chivas USA players
Toronto FC players
Honduran expatriate footballers
Expatriate footballers in Spain
Expatriate footballers in Mexico
Expatriate footballers in Costa Rica
Expatriate soccer players in the United States
Expatriate soccer players in Canada
Liga Nacional de Fútbol Profesional de Honduras players
La Liga players
Major League Soccer players
FIFA Century Club
Major League Soccer All-Stars
Toros Neza footballers
Copa Centroamericana-winning players
Honduran expatriate sportspeople in Canada
Honduran expatriate sportspeople in Costa Rica
Honduran expatriate sportspeople in Mexico
Honduran expatriate sportspeople in Spain
Honduran expatriate sportspeople in the United States